This list of Indonesian islands by area includes all Indonesian islands over 500 km2 in descending order by area.

References

See also 

 Indonesian Small Islands Directory
 List of Indonesian islands by population
 List of outlying islands of Indonesia

Area
Area
Lists of islands by area